Green ginger wine may refer to:
Ginger wine, often sold in green bottles, sometimes with "Green" on the label
"Green Ginger Wine", a song by the Rumjacks